Juraj Halaj (born 7 July 1969) is a Slovak professional ice hockey player who played with HC Slovan Bratislava in the Slovak Extraliga.

References

Living people
HC Slovan Bratislava players
1969 births
Slovak ice hockey centres
Czechoslovak ice hockey centres
HK Poprad players
HK Dukla Trenčín players
Expatriate ice hockey players in Slovenia
Slovak expatriate sportspeople in Slovenia
Slovak expatriate ice hockey people